Župetinci is a settlement in the Municipality of Cerkvenjak in northeastern Slovenia. It lies in the Slovene Hills in the valley of Župetinci Creek, a minor left tributary of the Pesnica River. The area is part of the traditional region of Styria and is now included in the Drava Statistical Region.

References

External links
Župetinci on Geopedia

Populated places in the Municipality of Cerkvenjak